Ajethna or Ajadina is a dry gravyless vegetable curry. Ajadina means dried in the Tulu language. The ajethna is eaten along with plain cooked rice as part of Udupi cuisine. The vegetables generally used in ajethna are cluster beans, french beans, beetroot, snake gourd, bitter gourd, ladies finger, and others.

Preparation
Wash the vegetables. Chop the vegetable into small rectangular pieces. Put coconut oil in a frying or saute pan and add red chilli and mustard seeds to the oil, saute it, add the chopped vegetables and salt to taste. Stir it for a few minutes and remove from heat. Turmeric powder or cumin seeds or garam masala can be added for different taste. The ajethna is generally served with cooked rice or chapati.

Indian curries
Karnataka cuisine